The 2008 Northern Mariana Islands Republican presidential caucuses took place on February 23, 2008.   John McCain won all 6 pledged (and the support of 3 unpledged delegates) at the commonwealth's convention.

Results

See also
 Republican Party (United States) presidential primaries, 2008
 Republican Party presidential debates, 2012
 Republican Party presidential primaries, 2012
 Results of the 2012 Republican Party presidential primaries

References

Republican caucuses
Northern Mariana Islands
2008